Bujumbura Rural Province is one of the 18 provinces of Burundi. Former President of Burundi Cyprien Ntaryamira was born here.

The province surrounds the former national capital Bujumbura. The provincial capital is Isale.

Communes
Bujumbura Rural Province administers nine communes:

 Commune of Isale
 Commune of Kabezi
 Commune of Kanyosha
 Commune of Mubimbi
 Commune of Mugongomanga
 Commune of Mukike
 Commune of Mutambu
 Commune of Mutimbuzi
 Commune of Nyabiraba

References

Provinces of Burundi
Rural